This is a list of the Lebanon national football team results from 2000 to 2009.

In 2000, Lebanon hosted the AFC Asian Cup: it came in last place in its group after two draws and one loss. The national team also failed to qualify for the 2002 and 2006 World Cups, as well as the 2004 Asian Cup.

Results

2000

2001

2002

2003

2004

2005

2006

2007

2008

2009

External links
Lebanon fixtures on FIFA.com
Lebanon fixtures on eloratings.net
Lebanon fixtures on RSSSF.com
International matches on RSSSF.com

2000s in Lebanese sport
2000-09